Rolf Hansen (12 December 1904 – 3 December 1990) was a German film director. He directed 20 films between 1936 and 1960.

Selected filmography

 The Great Love (1942)
 Back Then (1943)
 Vagabonds (1949)
 Dr. Holl (1950)
 The White Hell of Pitz Palu (1950)
 Desires (1952)
 The Great Temptation (1952)
 The Life of Surgeon Sauerbruch (1954)
 Beloved Enemy (1955)
 Devil in Silk (1956)
 The Last Ones Shall Be First (1957)
 And Lead Us Not Into Temptation (1957)
 Resurrection (1958)
 Gustav Adolf's Page (1960)

References

External links

1904 births
1990 deaths
Film directors from Thuringia
People from Ilmenau